Greater Wellington, also known as the Wellington Region (Māori: Te Upoko o te Ika), is a non-unitary region of New Zealand that occupies the southernmost part of the North Island.

The region takes its name from Wellington, New Zealand's capital city and the region's seat. The Wellington urban area, including the cities of Wellington, Porirua, Lower Hutt, and Upper Hutt, accounts for  percent of the region's population; other major urban areas include the  Kapiti conurbation (Waikanae, Paraparaumu, Raumati Beach, Raumati South, and Paekākāriki) and the town of Masterton.

Local government

The region is administered by the Wellington Regional Council, which uses the promotional name Greater Wellington Regional Council.

The council region covers the conurbation around the capital city, Wellington, and the cities of Lower Hutt, Porirua, and Upper Hutt, each of which has a rural hinterland; it extends up the west coast of the North Island, taking in the coastal settlements of the Kapiti Coast District; east of the Remutaka Range it includes three largely rural districts containing most of Wairarapa, covering the towns of Masterton, Carterton, Greytown, Featherston and Martinborough. The Wellington Regional Council was first formed in 1980 from a merger of the Wellington Regional Planning Authority and the Wellington Regional Water Board.

Following the creation of the Auckland Council 'super-city' in 2009, a similar merger for councils within the Wellington Region was investigated by the Local Government Commission in 2013. The proposal was scrapped in 2015 following negative public feedback.

Term Wellington region 

In common usage the terms Wellington region and Greater Wellington are not clearly defined, and areas on the periphery of the region are often excluded. In its more restrictive sense the region refers to the cluster of built-up areas west of the Tararua ranges. The much more sparsely populated area to the east has its own name, Wairarapa, and a centre in Masterton. To a lesser extent, the Kapiti Coast is sometimes excluded from the region. Otaki in particular has strong connections to the Horowhenua district to the north. This includes having been part of the MidCentral District Health Board (DHB) area, instead of the Capital and Coast DHB area like the rest of the Kāpiti Coast.

History 
The Māori who originally settled the region knew it as Te Upoko o te Ika a Māui, meaning "the head of Māui's fish". Legend recounts that Kupe discovered and explored the region in about the tenth century.

The region was settled by Europeans in 1839 by the New Zealand Company. Wellington became the capital of Wellington Province upon the creation of the province in 1853, until the Abolition of the Provinces Act came into force on 1 Nov 1876. Wellington became capital of New Zealand in 1865, the third capital after Russell and Auckland.

Geography 

The region occupies the southern tip of the North Island, bounded to the west, south and east by the sea.

Physically and topologically the region has four areas running roughly parallel along a northeast–southwest axis:
The Kapiti Coast, a narrow strip of coastal plain running north from Paekākāriki towards Foxton. It contains numerous small towns, many of which gain at least a proportion of their wealth from tourism, largely due to their fine beaches. 
Rough hill country inland from the Kapiti Coast, formed along the same major geologic fault responsible for the Southern Alps in the South Island. Though nowhere near as mountainous as the alps, the Remutaka and Tararua ranges are still hard country and support only small populations, although it is in small coastal valleys and plains at the southern end of these ranges that the cities of Wellington and the Hutt Valley are located.
The undulating hill country of the Wairarapa around the Ruamahanga River, which becomes lower and flatter in the south and terminates in the wetlands around Lake Wairarapa and contains much rich farmland. 
Rough hill country, lower than the Tararua Range but far less economic than the land around the Ruamahanga River. This and the other hilly striation are still largely forested.

Demographics

Wellington Region had a population of 506,814 at the 2018 New Zealand census, an increase of 35,499 people (7.5%) since the 2013 census, and an increase of 57,855 people (12.9%) since the 2006 census. There were 185,382 households. There were 247,401 males and 259,413 females, giving a sex ratio of 0.95 males per female. The median age was 37.2 years (compared with 37.4 years nationally), with 93,903 people (18.5%) aged under 15 years, 109,317 (21.6%) aged 15 to 29, 231,162 (45.6%) aged 30 to 64, and 72,426 (14.3%) aged 65 or older.

Of those at least 15 years old, 128,928 (31.2%) people had a bachelor or higher degree, and 55,359 (13.4%) people had no formal qualifications. The median income was $36,100, compared with $31,800 nationally. 94,065 people (22.8%) earned over $70,000 compared to 17.2% nationally. The employment status of those at least 15 was that 217,071 (52.6%) people were employed full-time, 58,725 (14.2%) were part-time, and 18,294 (4.4%) were unemployed.

Urban areas 
Over three-quarters of the  reside in the four cities at the southwestern corner. Other main centres of population are on the Kapiti Coast and in the fertile farming areas close to the upper Ruamahanga River in the Wairarapa.

Along the Kapiti Coast, numerous small towns sit close together, many of them occupying spaces close to popular beaches. From the north, these include Ōtaki, Waikanae, Paraparaumu, the twin settlements of Raumati Beach and Raumati South, Paekākāriki and Pukerua Bay, the latter being a northern suburb of Porirua. Each of these settlements has a population of between 2,000 and 10,000, making this moderately heavily populated.

In the Wairarapa the largest community by a considerable margin is Masterton, with a population of over 20,000. Other towns include Featherston, Martinborough, Carterton and Greytown.

Income and employment
The median income as of the 2018 census was $36,100. The employment status of those at least 15 was that 217,071 (52.6%) people were employed full-time, 58,725 (14.2%) were part-time, and 18,294 (4.4%) were unemployed.

Culture and identity
Ethnicities in the 2018 census were 74.6% European/Pākehā, 14.3% Māori, 8.4% Pacific peoples, 12.9% Asian, and 3.3% other ethnicities. People may identify with more than one ethnicity.

The proportion of people born overseas was 26.9%, compared with 27.1% nationally.

Although some people objected to giving their religion, 50.2% had no religion, 35.6% were Christian, 2.6% were Hindu, 1.1% were Muslim, 1.2% were Buddhist and 3.2% had other religions.

In the 2013 census, around 25.3 percent of the Wellington region's population was born overseas, second only to Auckland (39.1 percent) and on par with the New Zealand average (25.2 percent). The British Isles is the largest region of origin, accounting for 36.5 percent of the overseas-born population in the region. Significantly, the Wellington region is home to over half of New Zealand's Tokelauan-born population.

Catholicism was the largest Christian denomination in Wellington with 14.8 percent affiliating, while Anglicanism was the second-largest with 11.9 percent affiliating. Hinduism (2.4 percent) and Buddhism (1.6 percent) were the largest non-Christian religions in the 2013 census.

Museums
Key cultural institutions in the region include Te Papa in Wellington, the Dowse Art Museum in Lower Hutt, Pataka museum and gallery in Porirua.

Economy
The subnational gross domestic product (GDP) of the Wellington region was estimated at NZ$39.00 billion in the year to March 2019, 12.9% of New Zealand's national GDP. The subnational GDP per capita was estimated at $74,251 in the same period, the highest of all New Zealand regions. In the year to March 2018, primary industries contributed $389 million (1.0%) to the regional GDP, goods-producing industries contributed $5.93 billion (15.9%), service industries contributed $27.84 billion (74.5%), and taxes and duties contributed $3.20 billion (8.6%).

Transport

Public transport in the Region is well developed compared to other parts of New Zealand. It consists of buses, trains, cars, ferries and a funicular (the Wellington Cable Car). It also included trams until 1964 and trolleybuses until 2018. Buses and ferries are privately owned, with the infrastructure owned by public bodies, and public transport is often subsidised. The Regional Council is responsible for planning and subsidising public transport. The services are marketed under the name Metlink. Transdev Wellington operates the metropolitan train network, running from the Wellington CBD as far as Waikanae in the north and Masterton in the east. In the year to June 2015, 36.41 million trips were made by public transport with passengers travelling a combined 460.7 million kilometres, equal to 73 trips and 927 km per capita.

The Wellington region has the lowest rate of car ownership in New Zealand; 11.7 percent of households at the 2013 census did not have access to a car, compared to 7.9 percent for the whole of New Zealand. The number of households with more than one car is also the lowest: 44.4 percent compared to 54.5 percent nationally.

Biodiversity

From 2005 to 2015 there has been increase in the variety and number of native forest bird species, as well as an increase in the range of areas inhabited by these species, in Greater Wellington.

The internationally recognised Ramsar estuarine wetlands site at Foxton Beach is of note as having one of the most diverse ranges of wetlands birds to be seen at any one place in New Zealand. A total of 95 species have been identified at the estuary. It is a significant area of salt marsh and mudflat and a valuable feeding ground for many birds including the migratory Eastern bar-tailed Godwit, which flies all the way from Siberia to New Zealand to escape the harsh northern winter. The estuary is also a permanent home to 13 species of birds, six species of fish and four plants species, all of which are threatened. It regularly supports about one percent of the world population of wrybills.

See also
 List of people from Wellington
 Wellington City Council
 List of rivers of Wellington Region

References

External links

 Greater Wellington Regional Council official website
 Semi-official map of territorial boundaries and links to their websites